Simon Wright (born 19 June 1963) is an English drummer best known for his work with rock bands AC/DC and Dio. He started playing drums at the age of 13 and cites Cozy Powell, Tommy Aldridge and John Bonham as his greatest influences. He was also the drummer for the Rhino Bucket and Operation: Mindcrime bands.

Career
Wright began his career with local band Tora Tora (not to be confused with the American glam metal group), before joining Manchester group A II Z, a new wave of British heavy metal band founded in 1979 in Manchester, England by guitarist Gary Owens. The full line-up consisted of David Owens (vocals), Gary Owens (guitar), Gam Campbell (bass), Karl Reti (drums). They acquired a local following in Manchester, and were signed by Polydor Records, eager to cash in on the exploding NWOBHM boom. A single live album, The Witch of Berkley, followed in 1980. Reti was subsequently replaced by Wright. The band disintegrated and Wright went on to perform in Tytan and recorded on their full-length debut album Rough Justice, however; that band also dissolved shortly before the release of the debut.

Wright, just a month shy of turning twenty years old, joined AC/DC after their drummer, Phil Rudd, left in May 1983. Wright responded to an ad at the urging of a friend that AC/DC had put out in a magazine called Sounds in England that stated "Rock Drummer Wanted. If you don't hit hard, don't apply." Wright played three songs at the audition. Two hours after the audition, Wright got the call that he had gotten the gig. AC/DC recorded three albums with Wright in the mid-late 80s; Fly on the Wall, Who Made Who and Blow Up Your Video. Wright left the group in November 1989 to join Dio, and was replaced by Chris Slade. Wright joined Rhino Bucket when he wasn't working with Dio to replace the departed Liam Jason for their third album, 1994's independently released Pain. In 2007, he reunited with the band and is featured on The Hardest Town.

Wright has had two stints with Dio, 1990–91 and 1998–2010. With the band he has recorded four studio albums (Lock up the Wolves, Magica, Killing the Dragon and Master of the Moon) and two live albums (Evil or Divine - Live In New York City and Holy Diver - Live).

His drumming can be heard on albums by UFO, Michael Schenker Group and John Norum.

In 2005, Wright participated on a tribute album to Heavy metal icons Iron Maiden. It was his second of three times doing a tribute disc; the first experience being in 1998 on an AC/DC tribute album titled Thunderbolt, while in 2013 he took part in the DIO Tribute album "This Is Your Life".

In 2006, Wright is credited in the song "Lucy in the Sky with Diamonds" on the album Butchering the Beatles, a heavy metal tribute.

In August 2009, Wright teamed up with Joe Lynn Turner, Phil Soussan and Carlos Cavazo as part of the Big Noize project, playing shows in Iraq and Kuwait.

On 25 January 2013, it was announced that Wright had joined Geoff Tate's version of Queensrÿche, later known as Operation: Mindcrime, after Tate's dismissal from the band.

In 2018, Wright was announced as the drummer of Frontiers Records project called Dream Child with Craig Goldy on guitar.

Equipment

Drum kit
Wright is an endorser of DW drums. He uses the collectors maple series. 
His drum sizes are:
 18x22 bass drums (x2)
 10x12, 11x13, 13x15, 14x18 Tom-Toms
 6.5x14 Edge Snare
 6x14 Collector's Maple Snare
 5.5x14 Craviotto Solid Maple Snare
 5000TD3 Delta3 Turbo Single Bass Drum Pedal (x2)
 5500TD Delta Turbo Hi-Hat Stand
 9300 Snare Drum Stand
 9934 Double Tom/Cymbal Stand
 9700 Straight/Boom Cymbal Stand (x5)
 9100 Drum Throne
 799 DogBone (x2)

In the past, Wright used Sonor drums.

Drumheads
Wright also uses Evans Drum heads.
Products used:
 AF Patch – Kevlar Single Pedal 
 13" Onyx 2-ply
 15" G2 Coated
 18" G2 Coated
 14" Hazy 300
 15" EC Resonant
 18" EC Resonant
 13" G1 Clear

Cymbals
Wright uses Sabian Cymbals.
 14" AAX Metal Hats w/ Sizzle Bottom Hat
 18" AA China
 16" AA Metal Crash
 18" AAX Metal Crash
 19" AAX Metal Crash
 22" AAX Heavy Ride
 20" AA China
 20" AA Rock Crash
 20" AA Metal Crash w/ Sizzles

Sticks

 Vic Firth.
 American Classic Metal Nylon (CMN)

Discography

With Tora Tora
"Red Sun Setting" 7"

With A II Z
"I'm the One Who Loves You" 7" (Polydor 1981)

With AC/DC
Fly on the Wall (1985)
Who Made Who (1986)
Blow Up Your Video (1988)

With Dio
Lock Up the Wolves (1990)
Magica (2000)
Killing the Dragon (2002)
Master of the Moon (2004)
Evil or Divine (2005)
Holy Diver - Live (2006)

With UFO
 Live on Earth (1998/2003)
 Covenant (2000)

With Rhino Bucket
PAIN (1994)
PAIN & Suffering (2007)
The Hardest Town (2009)

With John Norum
Worlds Away (1996)

With Tim "Ripper" Owens
 Play My Game (2009)

With Mogg/Way
 Chocolate Box (1999)

With Geoff Tate's Queensrÿche
 Frequency Unknown (2013)

Instructional
Star Licks Productions (2000)

Operation: Mindcrime
 The Key (2015)
 Resurrection (2016)
 The New Reality (2017)

References

External links

English heavy metal drummers
English rock drummers
AC/DC members
UFO (band) members
Musicians from the Metropolitan Borough of Oldham
People from Oldham
Musicians from London
1963 births
Living people
Dio (band) members
Operation: Mindcrime (band) members